The 2015 Middle East Rally Championship was an international rally championship sanctioned by the FIA. The championship was contested over eight events held in eight countries across the Middle East region, running from February to November. The championship was significantly expanded for the 2015 season. The Oman International Rally returned to the calendar after a seven-year absence, while Iran joined the championship for the first time with the Shiraz Rally debuting in May, the last rally before the mid-year winter break.

For the fifth season in a row, Qatar's Nasser Al-Attiyah won the championship title. Al-Attiyah won six of the seven rallies he contested – the only failure being a retirement in Lebanon – en route to his eleventh MERC title overall. With his victory in Oman, Al-Attiyah also tied Mohammed bin Sulayem for most rally wins in the MERC, with 60. Al-Attiyah finished 48 points of his nearest challenger, Abdulaziz Al-Kuwari, who finished five rallies in second place during the 2015 season. Third place in the championship went to Khalid Al Qassimi, who won the rally that Al-Attiyah did not contest, the Dubai International Rally. Roger Feghali won the season's other event in Lebanon, but did not compete in enough events to be eligible for the championship standings.

Event calendar and results

The 2015 MERC was as follows:

Championship standings
The 2015 MERC for Drivers points was as follows: Only drivers that had contested at least five events during the season were eligible for the championship standings.

References

External links

Middle East Rally Championship
Middle East
Middle East Rally Championship